Puppenpavillon Bensberg  is a theatre in Bensberg, North Rhine-Westphalia, Germany.

Theatres in North Rhine-Westphalia